The 2011 Guangzhou International Women's Open (also known as the WANLIMA Guangzhou International Women's Open for sponsorship reasons) was a women's tennis tournament on outdoor hard courts. It was the 8th edition of the Guangzhou International Women's Open, and part of the WTA International tournaments of the 2011 WTA Tour. It took place in Guangzhou, People's Republic of China, from September 19 through September 24, 2011.

Champions

Singles

 Chanelle Scheepers defeated  Magdaléna Rybáriková, 6–2, 6–2
It was Scheeper's 1st career title. She became the first South African woman to win a title since Amanda Coetzer in 2003.

Doubles

 Hsieh Su-wei /  Zheng Saisai defeated  Chan Chin-wei /  Han Xinyun, 6–2, 6–1

Entrants

Seeds 

 1 Seeds are based on the rankings of September 12, 2011.

Other entrants 
The following players received wildcards into the singles main draw:
  Lu Jingjing
  Sun Shengnan
  Zheng Saisai

The following players received entry from the qualifying draw:

  Zarina Diyas
  Hsieh Su-wei
  Xu Yifan
  Zhao Yijing

External links 
 

Guangzhou International Women's Open
2011
2011 in Chinese tennis